In Your Veins is a 2009 Swedish/Norwegian drama film. It is based on the autobiographical novel by Lotta Thell. The film adaption was produced by Anna Croneman and directed by Beata Gårdeler, with the screenplay written by Karin Arrhenius.

Plot 
Eva (Malin Crépin) is a security officer struggling with heroin addiction. She tries to hide this secret from her colleagues and her new lover Erik (Joel Kinnaman) who is a police officer.

References

External links 
 

2009 films
2009 drama films
Norwegian drama films
Swedish drama films
2000s Swedish-language films
Films about heroin addiction
2000s Swedish films